BOC International Holdings Limited, shortly BOCI, is the wholly owned subsidiary of Bank of China, which offers investment banking and securities brokerage services. It was established in 1998 and headquartered in Hong Kong. It has subsidiaries in New York, London, Singapore, Beijing, Shanghai, Guangzhou and Chongqing.

Notable staff
Marshall Nicholson, vice-chairman of investment banking division (2007−2012), one of the first senior foreign hires at any Chinese bank

References

External links
BOC International Holdings Limited

Bank of China
Financial services companies established in 1998
Banks established in 1998
Investment banks in China